If is the eleventh studio album by American progressive rock band Glass Hammer. It is the first album to feature singer Jon Davison and guitarist Alan Shikoh.

The album marks a transition to a more "symphonic-progressive rock" sound, accorded to the band. The cover art was made by artist Tom Kuhn and all drums were provided by session member Randall Williams.

Track listing

Personnel 

Glass Hammer
 Jon Davison – lead vocals
 Fred Schendel –  keyboards, steel guitar, mandolin, backing vocals
 Alan Shikoh – guitars
 Steve Babb – bass, keyboards, backing vocals

Additional musicians
 Randall Williams – drums

Production
 Fred Schendel and Steve Babb – production
 Bob Katz – mastering
 Tom Kuhn – cover artwork
 Julie Babb – administration

References 

2010 albums
Glass Hammer albums